Dark Cloud is the first in a series of console role-playing games. Its spiritual sequel is Dark Cloud 2 or Dark Chronicle.

Dark cloud or dark clouds may also refer to:
 Dark nebula or dark cloud, a type of interstellar cloud
 Dark Cloud (actor), a Native Canadian silent film actor
 "Dark Clouds" (Rod Wave song), a song by Rod Wave 
 "Dark Clouds" (Space song), a song by Space
 "Dark Clouds",  a song by Rudimental from the album Toast to Our Differences 
 Dark Cloud, a fictional character in the 2000 film Crouching Tiger, Hidden Dragon

See also 
 Black Cloud (disambiguation)
 Dark Nebula, a character in the Kirby video game series
 List of cloud types